James Harry Lacey,  (1 February 1917 – 30 May 1989), was one of the top scoring Royal Air Force fighter pilots of the Second World War and was the second-highest scoring RAF fighter pilot of the Battle of Britain, behind Pilot Officer Eric Lock of No. 41 Squadron RAF. Lacey was credited with 28 enemy aircraft destroyed, five probables and nine damaged.

Early life
Lacey left King James Grammar School, Knaresborough in 1933, continuing his education at Leeds Technical College. He spent four years as an apprentice pharmacist.

RAF career
Lacey joined the RAFVR (Royal Air Force Volunteer Reserve) in January 1937 as a trainee pilot at Perth, Scotland. In 1938, he then took an instructor's course, becoming an instructor at the Yorkshire Flying School, accumulating 1,000 hours of flight time before the war. Called up at the outbreak of war, he joined No. 501 Squadron RAF.

Second World War

Battle of France
On 10 May 1940, the Squadron moved to Bétheniville in France where Lacey experienced his first combat. On the afternoon of 13 May over Sedan, he destroyed a Heinkel He 111 of KG 53 and an escorting Messerschmitt Bf 109 on one sortie, followed by a Messerschmitt Bf 110 later in the afternoon. He claimed two more He 111s on 27 May, before the squadron was withdrawn to England on 19 June, having claimed nearly 60 victories. On 9 June, his aircraft was damaged in combat and he crash landed and almost drowned in a swamp. During his operational duties in France, he was awarded the French Croix de Guerre.

Battle of Britain
Flying throughout the Battle of Britain with No. 501 based at RAF Gravesend or RAF Croydon, Lacey became one of the highest scoring pilots of the battle. His first kill of the battle was on 20 July 1940, when he shot down a Bf 109E of Jagdgeschwader 27. He then claimed a destroyed Ju 87 and a "probable" Ju 87 on 12 August, a damaged Bf 110 and a damaged Do 17 on 15 August and a probable Bf 109 on 16 August. He destroyed a Ju 88 and damaged a Dornier Do 17 on 24 August and shot down a Bf 109 of Jagdgeschwader 3 on 29 August. He had bailed out unharmed after being hit by return fire from a Heinkel He 111 on 13 August.

On 23 August 1940, Lacey was awarded the Distinguished Flying Medal after the destruction of 6 enemy aircraft.

On 30 August 1940, during combat over the Thames Estuary, Lacey shot down a He 111 and damaged a Bf 110 before his Hurricane was badly hit from enemy fire. His engine stopped and he decided to glide the stricken aircraft back to the airfield at Gravesend instead of bailing out into the Estuary.

A highly successful August was completed when he destroyed a Bf 109 on 31 August.

On 2 September 1940, Lacey shot down two Bf 109s and damaged a Do 17. He then shot down another two Bf 109s on 5 September. During a heavy raid on 13 September, he engaged a formation of Kampfgeschwader 55 He 111s over London where he shot down one of the bombers that had just bombed Buckingham Palace. As he could not find his airfield in the worsening visibility, he then bailed out of his aircraft, sustaining slight injuries.

Returning to the action shortly thereafter, he shot down an He 111 and three Bf 109s, and damaged another on 15 September 1940, one of the heaviest days of fighting during the whole battle, which later became known as "Battle of Britain Day". During the battle he attacked a formation of 12 Bf 109s, shooting down two before the others had noticed, before escaping into cloud

Two days later on 17 September, he was shot down over Ashford, Kent during a dogfight with Bf 109s and bailed out without injury. On 27 September, he destroyed a Bf 109 and damaged a Junkers Ju 88 on 30 September. During October he claimed a probable Bf 109 on 7 October, shot down a Bf 109 on 12 October, another on 26 October and on 30 October he destroyed a Bf 109 before damaging another.

During the Battle of France and the Battle of Britain, Lacey had been shot down or forced to land due to combat no less than nine times.

On 26 November 1940, with 23 claims (18 made during the Battle of Britain) Lacey received a Bar to his Distinguished Flying Medal for his continued outstanding courage and bravery during the Battle of Britain. The citation in the London Gazette read:

After 1940

Lacey's final award for outstanding service during 1940 was a Mention in Despatches announced on 1 January 1941. Lacey was commissioned a pilot officer (on probation) on 25 January 1941 (seniority from 15 January) and promoted to acting flight lieutenant in June. On 10 July 1941, as "A" flight commander, he shot down a Bf 109 and damaged another a few days later on 14 July. On 17 July, he claimed a Heinkel He 59 seaplane shot down and on 24 July, two Bf 109s (by causing them to collide). He was posted away from combat operations during August 1941, serving as a flight instructor with No. 57 Operational Training Unit. He was promoted to war substantive flying officer on 22 September.

During March 1942, Lacey joined No. 602 Squadron, based at Kenley flying the Spitfire Mk V and by 24 March had claimed a Fw 190 as damaged. He damaged another Fw 190 on 25 April 1942 before a posting to No. 81 Group as a tactics officer. Promoted to war substantive flight lieutenant on 27 August, in November he was posted as Chief Instructor at the No. 1 Special Attack Instructors School, Milfield.

In March 1943, Lacey was posted to No. 20 Squadron, Kaylan in India before joining 1572 Gunnery Flight in July of the same year to convert from Blenheims to Hurricanes and then to Republic P-47 Thunderbolts. He stayed in India, being posted to command No. 155 Squadron flying the Spitfire VIII in November 1944 and then as commanding officer of No. 17 Squadron later that month. While based in India, Lacey claimed his last aircraft on 19 February 1945, shooting down a Japanese Army Air Force Nakajima Ki 43 "Oscar" with only nine 20mm cannon rounds.

Lacey was one of the few RAF pilots on operational duties on both the opening and closing day of the war. His final tally was 28 confirmed, four probables and nine damaged.

Postwar
After the war was over, Lacey went to Japan with No. 17 Squadron, becoming the first Spitfire pilot to fly over Japan on 30 April 1946. He returned to the UK in May 1946. He received a permanent commission in the rank of flight lieutenant on 8 December 1948 (seniority from 1 September 1945), and retired from the RAF on 5 March 1967 as a flight lieutenant; he retained the rank of squadron leader.

Later life and legacy

After retirement, Lacey ran an air freight business and instructed at a flight school near Bridlington. He was an adviser to director Guy Hamilton on the set of his 1969 film Battle of Britain. Said Hamilton in an interview 30 years later "I entrusted Ginger Lacey to be my main adviser. He really was a good chap, totally invaluable."

Lacey died on 30 May 1989 at the age of 72. In September 2001, a plaque was unveiled at Priory Church, Bridlington, Yorkshire in memory of the fighter pilot and ace. There is also a plaque at the location of the house Lacey grew up in, on the old site of Nidd Vale Motors, Sandbeck Lane, Wetherby.

As a celebrated former pupil of King James’ School, an image of Lacey is displayed on one of the Knaresborough Town Windows, a series of trompe-l%27œil images managed by Renaissance Knaresborough.

In 2016, Beverley/Linley Hill Airfield named their new flight training centre after Lacey, and on 23 July 2017, a blue plaque was unveiled on the site of the house where he was born.

References

Citations

Bibliography

 Bickers, Richard Townshend. Ginger Lacey: Fighter Pilot. London: Hale Ltd., 1962. .
 Bishop, Edward, ed. The Daily Telegraph Book of Airmen's Obituaries. London: Grub Street, 2002. .
 
 Shores, Christopher and Clive Williams. Aces High. London: Grub Street, 1994. .

1917 births
1989 deaths
Military personnel from Yorkshire
Royal Air Force squadron leaders
Royal Air Force pilots of World War II
British World War II flying aces
People from Wetherby
People from the East Riding of Yorkshire
Recipients of the Distinguished Flying Medal
Recipients of the Croix de Guerre 1939–1945 (France)
The Few
Royal Air Force Volunteer Reserve personnel of World War II